The Mary Baldwin University, Main Building is a historic building on the Mary Baldwin University campus in Staunton, Virginia. It was built in 1844, and is a Greek Revival style educational building.  It consists of a two-story, five bay central section, flanked by three-bay two-story wings with full basement and projecting gable ends.  The front facade features a four-bay portico with four Greek Doric order columns supporting a Doric entablature and pediment.

It was listed on the National Register of Historic Places (NRHP) in 1973.

See also
Hilltop, C. W. Miller House, and Rose Terrace are other NRHP-listed buildings on the campus.

References

 

University and college buildings on the National Register of Historic Places in Virginia
National Register of Historic Places in Staunton, Virginia
School buildings completed in 1844
Mary Baldwin University
Buildings and structures in Staunton, Virginia
Greek Revival architecture in Virginia
University and college administration buildings in the United States